The Million Dollar Backpack is the third studio album by rapper Skillz, formerly known as Mad Skillz. It was released on July 22, 2008 on Koch Records and distributed by Big Kidz Entertainment. The first single off the album was "So Far So Good" featuring Common on the album version and Talib Kweli on the video version. It is the follow-up to Skillz 2005 album Confessions of a Ghostwriter.

Track listing

E1 Music albums
2008 albums
Albums produced by Questlove
Albums produced by Jake One
Skillz albums
Albums produced by Bink (record producer)